Sylvia S. Romo (born December 27, 1942 in San Antonio, Texas) is the former Tax Assessor-Collector for Bexar County, Texas. Bexar County is the 19th most populous in the U.S., with a 2010 census of over 1.7 million people and a taxing budget of over 2 billion dollars. She is the first elected female to hold this position.

Romo had previously served two terms in the Texas House of Representatives from 1992 to 1996 from Texas District 125 where she authored 68 and co-authored 22 Texas house bills respectively as an advocate for small business and minority issues. She sponsored additional house bills during her two terms. Romo had previously served as the chairwoman for the Bexar County Democratic party.

Romo is a Texas-certified CPA, graduating from the University of Texas, San Antonio with a B.A. in Business Administration. She is currently running against former Congressman Ciro Rodriguez seeking the Democratic party's nomination for U.S. Congresswoman from the newly created 35th congressional district of Texas, considered a bellwether district for the national elections and one in which she was born and raised. If elected, she will be the first Latina voted into Congress from Texas.

References

1942 births
Living people
Hispanic and Latino American state legislators in Texas
Hispanic and Latino American women in politics
Democratic Party members of the Texas House of Representatives
People from San Antonio
University of Texas at San Antonio alumni
Women state legislators in Texas
21st-century American women